Zhanjiang Airport  was an airport in Zhanjiang, Guangdong, China.
It was also called Zhanjiang Xiting International Airport, Zhanjiang Potou International Airport, or Zhanjiang Xiashan International Airport. It was founded in 1952 and closed on 24 March 2022, when the new Zhanjiang Wuchuan Airport opened.

See also
 List of airports in China

References

Airports in Guangdong
Defunct airports in China
Zhanjiang
Airports established in 1952
Airports disestablished in 2022